Inspector Gadget: Mad Robots Invasion is a video game based on the 1983 Inspector Gadget television series. The game was released for the PlayStation 2 in 2003 only in Europe.

Gameplay
The game takes the form of a 2.5D platformer with the player guiding the titular character through several levels to free his companions. Penny and Brain, who have been captured by Dr. Claw. The levels are based on real world locations such as New York City, Paris, London, Mexico and the Caribbean.

In the main levels the protagonist is limited with which gadgets can be used, however other tools can be used in the bonus minigames that appear throughout the game. The game also includes a two player mode unlocked when the game is beaten.

Reception

Inspector Gadget: Mad Robots Invasion a mostly negative response from reviewers. French website Jeuxvideo gave the game a score 8/20, criticising the graphics and the level design which felt was empty and unoriginal. They also noted that the game was buggy, although they did praise the jumping mechanics and animations which they called "very decent".

Gamezone Germany gave the game a 4.8/10, complementing the clearly laid out levels that made it hard to go in the wrong direction, but were critical of the animations which they thought were simplistic and repetitive. They were also highly critical of the sound design which they found annoying. They concluded that "At most, Gadget's PS2 debut can only excite the very young video gamers".

References

External links
GameFAQs

2003 video games
Europe-exclusive video games
Silmarils (company) games
Video games based on Inspector Gadget
PlayStation 2 games
PlayStation 2-only games
Video games about police officers
Video games developed in France
Single-player video games